Dharti Bhatt is an Indian TV actress. She is known for her role as Mahi in Mahisagar, as Pratibha in Kya Haal, Mr. Paanchal?. She is currently playing the role of Nayan in Colors TV show Shakti - Astitva Ke Ehsaas Ki.

Early life

Dharti Bhatt is from a Gujarati traditional family and is from Ahmedabad. She took up acting as a child, taking part in plays.

Career

After acting and anchoring work, Bhatt's breakthrough role came in the Hindi TV serial Love Marriage Ya Arrange Marriage which was aired on Sony TV. Her work in the serial was followed by being cast for a role in Jodha Akbar. Later, she was picked for a main role in Mahisagar, a series on Big Magic. She played the title role of Mahi, a small town girl who falls in love with Sagar and marries him but then has to cope with her domineering mother-in-law. From 2017, Bhatt has been performing the role of Pratibha in the Hindi serial Kya Haal, Mr. Paanchal?.

Personal life

Dharti is close to her mother and brother. She feels that by following an acting career she is fulfilling the wishes of her late father who had great faith in her acting talents. She is also a skilled dancer in many styles.

Television

See also 
 List of Hindi television actresses
 List of Indian television actresses

References

External links
 

Living people
Indian television actresses
Year of birth missing (living people)